St Augustine College in Malta was established as a faith school for boys by the Order of Saint Augustine in 1848 by Gaetano Pace dei Baroni Forno. He founded it in founded it in Valletta next door to the church of St. Augustine. It has since been relocated to Pietà. Since then, the primary sector has opened up in Marsa.

History 
In 2011, the school postponed primary school admissions as it waited for permits for a new building. The school was refused permits to build on an adjacent site.

In 2015, the school had 450 primary school students.

In 2020, plans were approved for the school to refurbish and expand into an adjacent property.

Bibliography

External links

St Augustine College in Malta St Augustine Homepage
Augnet International Cooperative Web Site for Schools in the Tradition of St. Augustine
Order of St Augustine, International Homepage

References 

Augustinian schools
Educational institutions established in 1848
Catholic schools in Malta
Schools in Malta
Pietà, Malta
1848 establishments in Malta
Marsa, Malta